Mbala is a constituency of the National Assembly of Zambia. It covers the towns of Kawimbe, Lunzua and Mbala in Mbala District of Northern Province. Like the town of Mbala, it was originally known as Abercorn.

List of MPs

References

Constituencies of the National Assembly of Zambia
1964 establishments in Zambia
Constituencies established in 1964